Daniel Widmer may refer to:

 Daniel Widmer (ice hockey), Swiss ice hockey player
 Daniel Widmer (curler), Swiss curler